Raymond Macdonald Alden (1873 – September 27, 1924) was an American scholar and educator.

Biography
Born in New Hartford, N. Y., his parents were the writer Isabella Macdonald Alden and Reverend Gustavus Rossenberg Alden. He studied at Rollins College in Winter Park, Florida, and at the University of Pennsylvania, from which he graduated in 1894 with a Ph.D. He took post-graduate studies there at Penn and at Harvard. In 1894–95 he was instructor in English at Columbian (now George Washington) University; in 1896–97 assistant in English at Harvard; and in 1898–99 senior fellow in English at the University of Pennsylvania. He was chosen to fill the position of assistant professor of English literature and rhetoric at Leland Stanford, Jr., University in 1899, then became associate professor there in 1909.  He accepted the chair of English at the University of Illinois in 1911.

He edited several plays of Shakespeare and other Elizabethan dramatists and in 1910 an edition of Thoreau's Walden.  Alden also became known as a contributor to educational journals and short stories to magazines. In 1905, his story "In the Promised Land" won a $1,000 prize for third place in a Collier's Weekly contest. In 1913 he edited an edition of Shakespeare's Sonnets and A Lover's Complaint.

Raymond Macdonald Alden died in Philadelphia on September 27, 1924.

Selected works
 The Rise of Formal Satire in England (1899) 
 The Art of Debate (1900) 
 On Seeing an Elizabethan Play (1903); also cataloged under the title of the featured play, The Trve Historie of the Knyght of the Bvrning Pestle,  
 Consolatio (1903) 
 The Knights of the Silver Shield, illustrated by Katharine Hayward Greenland (1906); illus. W. R. Lohse (1923) 
 The Great Walled Country (1906)
 An Introduction to Poetry  (1909)
 Why the Chimes Rang (1909)
 A Palace Made by Music (1910) 
 Tennyson, How to Know him (1917) 
 Critical Essays of the Early Nineteenth Century (1921) 
 Shakespeare (1922) 
 The Boy Who Found the King: A Tournament of Stories, illus. W. R. Lohse (1922); reissued as Once There Was a King: A Tournament of Stories, illus. Evelyn Copelman (1946)

Why the Chimes Rang is the story of a grand old church with beautiful chimes which mysteriously ring out every Christmas Eve whenever someone places an especially pleasing gift on the altar as an offering, and how a miracle occurs after the chimes have fallen silent for years. The story is a sort of variation on the Jongleur de Notre Dame and Little Drummer Boy themes.

The Knights of the Silver Shield, is included in Olive Beaupre Miller's Book House for Children anthology of children's literature.  It is a story about how sometimes the resistance of temptation and the simple act of gate-keeping can be an act of valor to rival all others.

"A Tournament of Stories" is the subtitle of Alden's last children's book. Its frame story features a kingdom whose Chief Story-Teller has recently died. Nine story-tellers finally vie for the position by telling one story each to Prince John, Princess Jane, and a jury of children.

References

External links
 
 
 
 Guide to the Raymond Macdonald Alden Papers at Online Archive of California (oac.cdlib.org)
 
 

American biographers
American male biographers
American male essayists
Harvard University alumni
Rollins College alumni
Harvard University faculty
Columbian College of Arts and Sciences faculty
University of Pennsylvania faculty
Stanford University Department of English faculty
University of Pennsylvania alumni
1873 births
1924 deaths